Louis Bernot (26 July 1896 - 19 February 1975) was a French weightlifter who competed in the 1920 Summer Olympics. He won the bronze medal in the heavyweight class.

References

External links
 
 
 
 

1896 births
1975 deaths
French male weightlifters
Olympic weightlifters of France
Olympic bronze medalists for France
Olympic medalists in weightlifting
Weightlifters at the 1920 Summer Olympics
Medalists at the 1920 Summer Olympics
20th-century French people